The 425th Bombardment Squadron is an inactive United States Air Force unit.  Its last assignment was with 308th Bombardment Wing at Plattsburgh Air Force Base, New York, where it was inactivated in 1961.

The squadron was active in the CBI as a B-24 Liberator unit.

History
Activated in early 1942 in Idaho as a long-range B-24 Liberator bombardment squadron under Second Air Force. For the next three months, little training occurred while the unit worked through its growing pains, resolving administrative and personnel acquisition difficulties.   Then a totally new problem arose....all but four personnel were transferred to the 330th Bombardment Group!   While active on paper, it wasn't until September that personnel were taken from the 39th Bombardment Group to form a headquarters cadre for the 308th Group, again making it a viable unit.   On 29 September the squadron was designated an Operational Training Unit (OTU) with Wendover Field, Utah as its home station.   The unit was fully manned by November, after receiving personnel from the 18th Replacement Wing.

During this time of trials and tribulations in forming a recognizable force, the flying echelon had transferred to Davis–Monthan Field, Arizona, on 20 June for incidental training.   The flight crews had been chosen and assigned, having completed their respective training schools; i.e., pilot, navigator, bombardier, engineer, radio and gunnery.

Members of the 425th had to complete three phases of training prior to moving overseas and entering combat.   The flying personnel spent most of October in transition training with the B-24, training combat crews as well.   Meanwhile, the ground echelon was acquiring, organizing and processing personnel and supplies at Wendover Field.

With the training complete and the personnel and supplies processed, the 308th Bomb Group and the 425th BS officially transferred to Fourteenth Air Force in China early in 1943.   The air echelon began flying its 'brand new' B-24D Liberators from Morrison Field, Florida on 15 February 1943.   Traveling by way of the South Atlantic Transport Route through Central and South America, the Azores, Central Africa, Arabia and finally India; while the ground echelon traveled by ship across the Pacific Ocean.

The squadron arrived in India and made many trips over the 'Hump' between India and China to obtain gasoline, bombs, spare parts, and other items they needed to prepare for and sustain their combat operations.   The 425th supported Chinese ground forces; attacked airfields, coal yards, docks, oil refineries and fuel dumps in French Indochina; mined rivers and ports; bombed maintenance shops and docks at Rangoon, Burma; attacked Japanese shipping in the East China Sea, Formosa Straits, South China Sea and Gulf of Tonkin.

The squadron moved to India in June 1945, ferrying gasoline and supplies from there back into China.  The unit sailed for the United States, where it was inactivated on 6 January 1946.

The squadron was activated again in 1958 as Strategic Air Command (SAC)'s Boeing B-47 Stratojet fleet reached a peak of twenty-seven wings and SAC added a fourth squadron to each wing. However, newer and more capable Boeing B-52 Stratofortresses and the number of Strategic Wings equipped with dispersed B-52s more than doubled between 1959 and 1960.  In March 1961, President John F. Kennedy directed that the phaseout of the B-47 be accelerated. As a result, the squadron became non-operational in July 1959 and was inactivated on 25 June 1961, and its aircraft were sent to storage with the 2704th AF Aircraft Storage and Disposition Group at Davis–Monthan AFB, Arizona.

Lineage
 Constituted as the 36th Reconnaissance Squadron (Heavy) on 28 January 1942
 Activated on 15 April 1942.
 Redesignated 425th Bombardment Squadron (Heavy) on 22 April 1942
 Redesignated 425th Bombardment Squadron, Heavy in 1944
 Inactivated on 6 January 1946
 Redesignated 425th Bombardment Squadron, Medium on 11 August 1958
 Activated on 1 October 1958
 Discontinued, and inactivated, on 25 June 1961.

Assignments
 308th Bombardment Group: 15 April 1942 – 6 January 1946
 308th Bombardment Wing: 1 October 1958 – 25 June 1961 (not operational after 15 July 1959)

Stations

 Gowen Field, Idaho, 15 April 1942
 Davis–Monthan Field, Arizona, 18 June 1942
 Alamogordo Army Air Field, New Mexico, 24 July 1942
 Davis–Monthan Field, Arizona, 28 August 1942
 Wendover Field, Utah, 1 October 1942
 Pueblo Army Air Base, Colorado, 1 December 1942 – 2 January 1943

 Kunming Airport, China, 20 March 1943
 Kwanghan Airfield, China, 18 February 1945
 Rupsi Airfield, India, 27 June 1945 – 14 October 1945
 Camp Kilmer, New Jersey, 5 January 1946 – 6 January 1946
 Hunter AFB, Georgia, 1 October 1958
 Plattsburgh AFB, New York, 15 July 1959 – 25 June 1961

Aircraft
 Douglas B-18 Bolo, 1942
 Consolidated B-24 Liberator, 1942–1945
 Boeing B-47 Stratojet, 1958–1959

References

Notes

Bibliography

 
 
 

Bombardment squadrons of the United States Air Force
Bombardment squadrons of the United States Army Air Forces
World War II strategic bombing units
Units and formations of Strategic Air Command